Barrelville may refer to:

Barrelville, Maryland
Barrelville, South Carolina